Catherine Cooke was an architect.

Catherine Cooke or Cook may also refer to:

Lady Catherine Killigrew (died 1583), born Lady Catherine Cooke
David and Catherine Cook

See also
Katharine Cook (1863–1938), British medical missionary in Uganda
Katharine Cook Briggs (1875–1968) (maiden name Cook), co-creator, with her daughter Isabel Briggs Myers, of an inventory of personality type known as the Myers–Briggs Type Indicator
Kathy Smallwood-Cook (born 1960) (maiden name Kathryn Cook), British sprinter
Kathy Cook (journalist), Canadian journalist and non-fiction writer
Katie Cook (writer) (born 1981), American comic artist and writer
Cathy Cooke, English cricketer